The Middlesex Registry Act 1708 (7 Ann c 20) was an Act of the Parliament of Great Britain.

The whole Act so far as unrepealed, but without prejudice to any registration, entry or duty to register thereunder, was repealed by section 1 of, and Schedule 1 to, the Statute Law Revision Act 1948.

Section 2
This section, from "in the manner following" to the end of the section, was repealed by section 7 of, and Schedule 2 to, the Land Registry (Middlesex Deeds) Act 1891.

Sections 3 to 7 and 11 to 14
Sections 3 to 7 and 11 to 14 were repealed by section 7 of, and Schedule 2 to, the Land Registry (Middlesex Deeds) Act 1891.

Section 15
So much of section 15 as related to any forging or counterfeiting therein mentioned was repealed by section 1 of, and the Schedule to, 24 & 25 Vict c 95.

Section 16
This section was repealed by section 7 of, and Schedule 2 to, the Land Registry (Middlesex Deeds) Act 1891.

Section 19
This section was repealed by section 7 of, and Schedule 2 to, the Land Registry (Middlesex Deeds) Act 1891.

Section 20
This section was repealed by section 7 of, and Schedule 2 to, the Land Registry (Middlesex Deeds) Act 1891.

Section 21
This section was repealed by section 1 of, and the Schedule to, the Statute Law Revision Act 1887.

Section 22
This section was repealed by section 7 of, and Schedule 2 to, the Land Registry (Middlesex Deeds) Act 1891.

References
Halsbury's Statutes,

Great Britain Acts of Parliament 1708